John Tabone (born 25 July 1958) is a Maltese sailor. He competed in the Laser event at the 1996 Summer Olympics.

References

External links
 

1958 births
Living people
Maltese male sailors (sport)
Olympic sailors of Malta
Sailors at the 1996 Summer Olympics – Laser
Place of birth missing (living people)